Amartya Kumar Sen (born 3 November 1933) is an Indian economist and philosopher, who since 1972 has taught and worked in the United Kingdom and the United States. Sen has made contributions to welfare economics, social choice theory, economic and social justice, economic theories of famines, decision theory, development economics, public health, and measures of well-being of countries.

He is currently a Thomas W. Lamont University Professor, and Professor of Economics and Philosophy at Harvard University. He formerly served as Master of Trinity College at the University of Cambridge. He was awarded the Nobel Memorial Prize in Economic Sciences in 1998 and India's Bharat Ratna in 1999 for his work in welfare economics. The German Publishers and Booksellers Association awarded him the 2020 Peace Prize of the German Book Trade for his pioneering scholarship addressing issues of global justice and combating social inequality in education and healthcare.

Early life and education

Amartya Sen was born in a Hindu Baidya family in Santiniketan, Bengal, British India. Rabindranath Tagore gave Amartya Sen his name. Sen's family was from Wari and Manikganj, Dhaka, both in present-day Bangladesh. His father Ashutosh Sen was Professor of Chemistry at Dhaka University, Development Commissioner in Delhi and then Chairman of the West Bengal Public Service Commission. He moved with his family to West Bengal in 1945. Sen's mother Amita Sen was the daughter of Kshiti Mohan Sen, the eminent Sanskritist and scholar of ancient and medieval India, who was a close associate of Rabindranath Tagore. K.M. Sen served as the second Vice Chancellor of Visva Bharati University from 1953 to 1954.

Sen began his school education at St Gregory's School in Dhaka in 1940. In the fall of 1941, Sen was admitted to Patha Bhavana, Shantiniketan, where he completed his school education. The school had many progressive features, such as distaste for examinations or competitive testing. In addition, the school stressed cultural diversity, and embraced cultural influences from the rest of the world. In 1951, he went to Presidency College, Calcutta, where he earned a B.A. in economics with First in the First Class, with a minor in Mathematics, as a graduating student of the University of Calcutta. While at Presidency, Sen was diagnosed with oral cancer, and given a 15% chance of living five years. With radiation treatment, he survived, and in 1953 he moved to Trinity College, Cambridge, where he earned a second B.A. in economics in 1955 with a First Class, topping the list as well. At this time, he was elected President of the Cambridge Majlis. While Sen was officially a PhD student at Cambridge (though he had finished his research in 1955–56), he was offered the position of First-Professor and First-Head of the Economics Department of the newly created Jadavpur University in Calcutta. He is still the youngest chairman to have headed the Department of Economics. He served in that position, starting the new Economics Department, from 1956 to 1958.

Meanwhile, Sen was elected to a Prize Fellowship at Trinity College, which gave him four years of freedom to do anything he liked; he made the radical decision to study philosophy. Sen explained: "The broadening of my studies into philosophy was important for me not just because some of my main areas of interest in economics relate quite closely to philosophical disciplines (for example, social choice theory makes intense use of mathematical logic and also draws on moral philosophy, and so does the study of inequality and deprivation), but also because I found philosophical studies very rewarding on their own." His interest in philosophy, however, dates back to his college days at Presidency, where he read books on philosophy and debated philosophical themes. One of the books he was most interested in was Kenneth Arrow's Social Choice and Individual Values.

In Cambridge, there were major debates between supporters of Keynesian economics, and the neo-classical economists who were skeptical of Keynes. Because of a lack of enthusiasm for social choice theory in both Trinity and Cambridge, Sen chose a different subject for his PhD thesis, which was on "The Choice of Techniques" in 1959. The work had been completed earlier, except for advice from his adjunct supervisor in India, Professor A.K. Dasgupta, given to Sen while teaching and revising his work at Jadavpur, under the supervision of the "brilliant but vigorously intolerant" post-Keynesian, Joan Robinson. Quentin Skinner notes that Sen was a member of the secret society Cambridge Apostles during his time at Cambridge.

During 1960–61, Amartya Sen visited the Massachusetts Institute of Technology, on leave from Trinity College.

Research work

Sen's work on 'Choice of Techniques' complemented that of Maurice Dobb. In a developing country, the Dobb-Sen strategy relied on maximising investible surpluses, maintaining constant real wages and using the entire increase in labour productivity, due to technological change, to raise the rate of accumulation. In other words, workers were expected to demand no improvement in their standard of living despite having become more productive.
Sen's papers in the late 1960s and early 1970s helped develop the theory of social choice, which first came to prominence in the work by the American economist Kenneth Arrow. Arrow had most famously shown that when voters have three or more distinct alternatives (options), any ranked order voting system will in at least some situations inevitably conflict with what many assume to be basic democratic norms. Sen's contribution to the literature was to show under what conditions Arrow's impossibility theorem applied, as well as to extend and enrich the theory of social choice, informed by his interests in history of economic thought and philosophy.

In 1981, Sen published Poverty and Famines: An Essay on Entitlement and Deprivation (1981), a book in which he argued that famine occurs not only from a lack of food, but from inequalities built into mechanisms for distributing food. Sen also argued that the Bengal famine was caused by an urban economic boom that raised food prices, thereby causing millions of rural workers to starve to death when their wages did not keep up.

Sen's interest in famine stemmed from personal experience. As a nine-year-old he witnessed the Bengal famine of 1943, in which three million people died. This staggering loss of life was unnecessary, Sen later concluded. He presents data that there was an adequate food supply in Bengal at the time, but particular groups of people including rural landless labourers and urban service providers like barbers did not have the means to buy food as its price rose rapidly due to factors that include acquisitions by the military, panic buying, hoarding, and price gouging, all of them connected to the war in the region. In Poverty and Famines, Sen revealed that in many cases of famine, food supplies were not significantly reduced. In Bengal, for example, food production, while down on the previous year, was higher than in previous non-famine years. Sen points to a number of social and economic factors, such as declining wages, unemployment, rising food prices, and poor food-distribution, which led to starvation. His capabilities approach focuses on positive freedom, a person's actual ability to be or do something, rather than on negative freedom approaches, which are common in economics and simply focuses on non-interference. In the Bengal famine, rural laborers' negative freedom to buy food was not affected. However, they still starved because they were not positively free to do anything, they did not have the functioning of nourishment, nor the capability to escape morbidity.

In addition to his important work on the causes of famines, Sen's work in the field of development economics has had considerable influence in the formulation of the "Human Development Report", published by the United Nations Development Programme. This annual publication that ranks countries on a variety of economic and social indicators owes much to the contributions by Sen among other social choice theorists in the area of economic measurement of poverty and inequality.

Sen's revolutionary contribution to development economics and social indicators is the concept of "capability" developed in his article Equality of What. He argues that governments should be measured against the concrete capabilities of their citizens. This is because top-down development will always trump human rights as long as the definition of terms remains in doubt (is a "right" something that must be provided or something that simply cannot be taken away?). For instance, in the United States citizens have a right to vote. To Sen, this concept is fairly empty. In order for citizens to have a capacity to vote, they first must have "functionings". These "functionings" can range from the very broad, such as the availability of education, to the very specific, such as transportation to the polls. Only when such barriers are removed can the citizen truly be said to act out of personal choice. It is up to the individual society to make the list of minimum capabilities guaranteed by that society. For an example of the "capabilities approach" in practice, see Martha Nussbaum's Women and Human Development.

He wrote a controversial article in The New York Review of Books entitled "More Than 100 Million Women Are Missing" (see Missing women of Asia), analyzing the mortality impact of unequal rights between the genders in the developing world, particularly Asia. Other studies, including one by Emily Oster, had argued that this is an overestimation, though Oster has since then recanted her conclusions.

In 1999, Sen further advanced and redefined the capability approach in his book Development as Freedom. Sen argues that development should be viewed as an effort to advance the real freedoms that individuals enjoy, rather than simply focusing on metrics such as GDP or income-per-capita. Sen was inspired by violent acts he had witnessed as a child leading up to the Partition of India in 1947. On one morning, a Muslim daily labourer named Kader Mia stumbled through the rear gate of Sen's family home, bleeding from a knife wound in his back. Because of his extreme poverty, he had come to Sen's primarily Hindu neighbourhood searching for work; his choices were the starvation of his family or the risk of death in coming to the neighbourhood. The price of Kader Mia's economic unfreedom was his death. Kader Mia need not have come to a hostile area in search of income in those troubled times if his family could have managed without it. This experience led Sen to begin thinking about economic unfreedom from a young age.

In Development as Freedom, Sen outlines five specific types of freedoms: political freedoms, economic facilities, social opportunities, transparency guarantees, and protective security. Political freedoms refer to the ability of the people to have a voice in government and to be able to scrutinize the authorities. Economic facilities concern both the resources within the market and the market mechanism itself. Any focus on income and wealth in the country would serve to increase the economic facilities for the people. Social opportunities deal with the establishments that provide benefits like healthcare or education for the populace, allowing individuals to live better lives. Transparency guarantees allow individuals to interact with some degree of trust and knowledge of the interaction. Protective security is the system of social safety nets that prevent a group affected by poverty being subjected to terrible misery. Before Sen's work, these had been viewed as only the ends of development; luxuries afforded to countries that focus on increasing income. However, Sen argues that the increase in real freedoms should be both the ends and the means of development. He elaborates upon this by illustrating the closely interconnected natures of the five main freedoms as he believes that expansion of one of those freedoms can lead to expansion in another one as well. In this regard he discusses the correlation between social opportunities of education and health and how both of these complement economic and political freedoms as a healthy and well-educated person is better suited to make informed economic decisions and be involved in fruitful political demonstrations etc. A comparison is also drawn between China and India to illustrate this interdependence of freedoms. Both countries were working towards developing their economies, China since 1979 and India since 1991.

Welfare economics seeks to evaluate economic policies in terms of their effects on the well-being of the community. Sen, who devoted his career to such issues, was called the "conscience of his profession". His influential monograph Collective Choice and Social Welfare (1970), which addressed problems related to individual rights (including formulation of the liberal paradox), justice and equity, majority rule, and the availability of information about individual conditions, inspired researchers to turn their attention to issues of basic welfare. Sen devised methods of measuring poverty that yielded useful information for improving economic conditions for the poor. For instance, his theoretical work on inequality provided an explanation for why there are fewer women than men in India and in China despite the fact that in the West and in poor but medically unbiased countries, women have lower mortality rates at all ages, live longer, and make a slight majority of the population. Sen claimed that this skewed ratio results from the better health treatment and childhood opportunities afforded boys in those countries, as well as sex-selective abortions.

Governments and international organisations handling food crises were influenced by Sen's work. His views encouraged policy makers to pay attention not only to alleviating immediate suffering but also to finding ways to replace the lost income of the poor—for example through public works—and to maintain stable prices for food. A vigorous defender of political freedom, Sen believed that famines do not occur in functioning democracies because their leaders must be more responsive to the demands of the citizens. In order for economic growth to be achieved, he argued, social reforms—such as improvements in education and public health—must precede economic reform.

In 2009, Sen published a book called The Idea of Justice. Based on his previous work in welfare economics and social choice theory, but also on his philosophical thoughts, Sen presented his own theory of justice that he meant to be an alternative to the influential modern theories of justice of John Rawls or John Harsanyi. In opposition to Rawls but also earlier justice theoreticians Immanuel Kant, Jean-Jacques Rousseau or David Hume, and inspired by the philosophical works of Adam Smith and Mary Wollstonecraft, Sen developed a theory that is both comparative and realisations-oriented (instead of being transcendental and institutional). However, he still regards institutions and processes as being equally important. As an alternative to Rawls's veil of ignorance, Sen chose the thought experiment of an impartial spectator as the basis of his theory of justice. He also stressed the importance of public discussion (understanding democracy in the sense of John Stuart Mill) and a focus on people's capabilities (an approach that he had co-developed), including the notion of universal human rights, in evaluating various states with regard to justice.

Career
Sen began his career both as a teacher and a research scholar in the Department of Economics, Jadavpur University as a professor of economics in 1956. He spent two years in that position. From 1957 to 1963, Sen served as a fellow of Trinity College, Cambridge. Between 1960 and 1961, Sen was a visiting professor at Massachusetts Institute of Technology in the United States, where he got to know Paul Samuelson, Robert Solow, Franco Modigliani, and Norbert Wiener. He was also a visiting professor at the University of California, Berkeley (1964–1965) and Cornell University (1978–1984). He taught as Professor of Economics between 1963 and 1971 at the Delhi School of Economics (where he completed his magnum opus Collective Choice and Social Welfare in 1969).

During this time Sen was also a frequent visitor to various other premiere Indian economic schools and centres of excellence like Jawaharlal Nehru University, Indian Statistical Institute, Centre for Development Studies, Gokhale Institute of Politics and Economics and Centre for Studies in Social Sciences. He was a companion of distinguished economists like Manmohan Singh (ex-Prime Minister of India and a veteran economist responsible for liberalizing the Indian economy), K. N. Raj (advisor to various prime ministers and a veteran economist who was the founder of Centre for Development Studies, Trivandrum, which is one of India's premier think tanks and schools) and Jagdish Bhagwati (who is known to be one of the greatest Indian economists in the field of international trade and currently teaches at Columbia University). This is a period considered to be a Golden Period in the history of DSE. In 1971, he joined the London School of Economics as a professor of economics, where he taught until 1977. From 1977 to 1988, he taught at the University of Oxford, where he was first a professor of economics and fellow of Nuffield College, and then the Drummond Professor of Political Economy and a fellow of All Souls College, Oxford, from 1980.

In 1987, Sen joined Harvard as the Thomas W. Lamont University Professor of Economics. In 1998 he was appointed as Master of Trinity College, Cambridge, becoming the first Asian head of an Oxbridge college. In January 2004, Sen returned to Harvard. He also established the Eva Colorni Trust at the former London Guildhall University in the name of his deceased wife.

In May 2007, he was appointed as chairman of Nalanda Mentor Group to examine the framework of international cooperation, and proposed structure of partnership, which would govern the establishment of Nalanda International University Project as an international centre of education seeking to revive the ancient center of higher learning which was present in India from the fifth century to 1197.

He chaired the Social Sciences jury for the Infosys Prize from 2009 to 2011, and the Humanities jury from 2012 to 2018.

On 19 July 2012, Sen was named the first chancellor of the proposed Nalanda University (NU). Sen was criticized as the project suffered due to inordinate delays, mismanagement and lack of presence of faculty on ground. Finally teaching began in August 2014. On 20 February 2015, Sen withdrew his candidature for a second term.

Memberships and associations
He has served as president of the Econometric Society (1984), the International Economic Association (1986–1989), the Indian Economic Association (1989) and the American Economic Association (1994). He has also served as president of the Development Studies Association and the Human Development and Capability Association. He serves as the honorary director of the Academic Advisory Committee of the Center for Human and Economic Development Studies at Peking University in China.

Sen has been called "the Conscience of the profession" and "the Mother Teresa of Economics" for his work on famine, human development theory, welfare economics, the underlying mechanisms of poverty, gender inequality, and political liberalism. However, he denies the comparison to Mother Teresa, saying that he has never tried to follow a lifestyle of dedicated self-sacrifice. Amartya Sen also added his voice to the campaign against the anti-gay Section 377 of the Indian Penal Code.

Sen has served as Honorary Chairman of Oxfam, the UK based international development charity, and is now its Honorary Advisor.

Sen is also a member of the Berggruen Institute's 21st Century Council.

Sen is an Honorary Fellow of St Edmund's College, Cambridge.

He is also one of the 25 leading figures on the Information and Democracy Commission launched by Reporters Without Borders.

Media and culture
A 56-minute documentary named Amartya Sen: A Life Re-examined directed by Suman Ghosh details his life and work. A documentary about Amartya Sen, titled The Argumentative Indian (the title of one of Sen's own books), was released in 2017.

A 2001 portrait of Sen by Annabel Cullen is in Trinity College's collection. A 2003 portrait of Sen hangs in the National Portrait Gallery in London.

In 2011, he was present at the Rabindra Utsab ceremony at Bangabandhu International Conference Centre (BICC), Bangladesh. He unveiled the cover of Sruti Gitobitan, a Rabindrasangeet album comprising all the 2222 Tagore songs, brought out by Rezwana Chowdhury Bannya, principal of Shurer Dhara School of Music.

Max Roser said that it was the work of Sen that made him create Our World in Data.

Political views
Sen was critical of Indian politician Narendra Modi when he was announced as its prime ministerial candidate by the BJP. In April 2014, he said that Modi would not make a good Prime Minister. He conceded later in December 2014 that Modi did give people a sense of faith that things can happen. In February 2015, Sen opted out of seeking a second term for the chancellor post of Nalanda University, stating that the Government of India was not keen on him continuing in the post.

In August 2019, during the clampdown and curfew in Kashmir for more than two weeks after the Indian revocation of Jammu and Kashmir's special status, Sen criticized the government and said "As an Indian, I am not proud of the fact that India, after having done so much to achieve a democratic norm in the world – where India was the first non-Western country to go for democracy – that we lose that reputation on the grounds of action that have been taken". He regarded the detention of Kashmiri political leaders as "a classical colonial excuse" to prevent backlash against the Indian government's decision and called for a democratic solution that would involve Kashmiri people.

Sen has spent much of his later life as a political writer and activist. He has been outspoken about Narendra Modi's leadership in India. In an interview with the New York Times, he claimed that Modi's fearmongering among the Indian people was anti-democratic. "The big thing that we know from John Stuart Mill is that democracy is government by discussion, and, if you make discussion fearful, you are not going to get a democracy, no matter how you count the votes." He disagreed with Modi's ideology of Hindu nationalism, and advocated for a more integrated and diverse ideology that reflects the heterogeneity of India.

Sen also wrote an article for the New York Times documenting the reasons why India trails behind China in economic development. He advocates for healthcare reform, because low-income people in India have to deal with exploitative and inadequate private healthcare. He recommends India implement the same education policies that Japan did in the late 19th century. However, he realizes that there is a tradeoff between democracy and progress in Asia because democracy is a near reality in India and not in China.

In a 1999 article in The Atlantic, Sen recommended for India a middle path between the "hard-knocks" development policy that creates wealth at the expense of civil liberties, and radical progressivism that only seeks to protect civil liberties at the expense of development. Rather than create an entirely new theory for ethical development in Asia, Sen sought to reform the current development model.

Personal life and beliefs

Sen has been married three times. His first wife was Nabaneeta Dev Sen, an Indian writer and scholar, with whom he had two daughters: Antara, a journalist and publisher, and Nandana, a Bollywood actress. Their marriage broke up shortly after they moved to London in 1971. In 1978 Sen married Eva Colorni, an Italian economist, daughter of Eugenio Colorni and Ursula Hirschmann and niece of Albert O. Hirschman. The couple had two children, a daughter Indrani, who is a journalist in New York, and a son Kabir, a hip hop artist, MC, and music teacher at Shady Hill School. Eva died of cancer in 1985. In 1991, Sen married Emma Georgina Rothschild, who serves as the Jeremy and Jane Knowles Professor of History at Harvard University.

The Sens have a house in Cambridge, Massachusetts, which is the base from which they teach during the academic year. They also have a home in Cambridge, England, where Sen is a Fellow of Trinity College, Cambridge, and Rothschild is a Fellow of Magdalene College. He usually spends his winter holidays at his home in Shantiniketan in West Bengal, India, where he used to go on long bike rides until recently. Asked how he relaxes, he replies: "I read a lot and like arguing with people."

Sen is an atheist. In an interview, he noted:

Awards and honours
Sen has received over 90 honorary degrees from universities around the world. In 2019, London School of Economics announced the creation of the Amartya Sen Chair in Inequality Studies.
 Adam Smith Prize, 1954
 Foreign Honorary Member of the American Academy of Arts and Sciences, 1981
 Honorary fellowship by the Institute of Social Studies, 1984
 Resident member of the American Philosophical Society, 1997
 Nobel Memorial Prize in Economic Sciences, 1998
 Bharat Ratna, the highest civilian award in India, 1999
 Honorary citizenship of Bangladesh, 1999
 Order of Companion of Honour, UK, 2000
 Leontief Prize, 2000
 Eisenhower Medal for Leadership and Service, 2000
 351st Commencement Speaker of Harvard University, 2001
 International Humanist Award from the International Humanist and Ethical Union, 2002
 Lifetime Achievement Award by the Indian Chamber of Commerce, 2004
 Life Time Achievement award by Bangkok-based United Nations Economic and Social Commission for Asia and the Pacific (UNESCAP)
 National Humanities Medal, 2011
 Order of the Aztec Eagle, 2012
 Chevalier of the French Legion of Honour, 2013
 25 Greatest Global Living Legends in India by NDTV, 2013
 Top 100 thinkers who have defined our century by The New Republic, 2014
 Charleston-EFG John Maynard Keynes Prize, 2015
 Albert O. Hirschman Prize, Social Science Research Council, 2016
 Johan Skytte Prize in Political Science, 2017
 Bodley Medal, 2019
 Friedenspreis des Deutschen Buchhandels, 2020
 Princess of Asturias Award, 2021
 In 2021, he received the prestigious Gold Medal from The National Institute of Social Sciences.

Bibliography

Books

 
 
 
 
 
Reprinted as: 
Reviewed in the Social Scientist: 
 
Reprinted as: 
 
 
Reprinted as:  Reviewed in The Economic Journal.
 
 
 
 
Also printed as: 
Extract 1. (Via Ian Stoner, lecturer, Department of Philosophy, University of Minnesota, readings.)
Extract 2.
 
 
 
 
 
Review in Asia Times.
 
 
Preview.
 
Chapter-preview links – 1.
Chapter-preview links – 2.
 
Review The Guardian.
Review The Washington Post.
 
 
Extract: "Imperial illusions: India, Britain, and the wrong lessons."
 
 
Preview.

Chapters in books
 
Reprinted as: 
Pdf version. 
 
 
 
Reprinted in 
  See also: The New Palgrave Dictionary of Economics.
  See also: The New Palgrave Dictionary of Economics.

Journal articles

Lecture transcripts
 Sen, Amartya (25 May 1997), Human Rights and Asian Values, Sixteenth Annual Morgenthau Memorial Lecture on Ethics and Foreign Policy
 
 
News coverage of the 1998 Romanes Lecture in the Oxford University Gazette.

Papers

Selected works in Persian
A list of Persian translations of Amartya Sen's work is available here

See also

 Abhijit Banerjee
 Equality of autonomy, a concept of equality posed by Sen
 Feminist economics
 Human Development Index
 List of feminist economists
 Kerala model, an expression or concept observed and introduced by Sen 
 Instrumental and value rationality, describing some of his differences with John Rawls, Robert Nozick, and James Gouinlock.

References

Further reading
 
 
 Amartya Sen Biographical

External links

 Amartya Sen at Harvard University
 
 Amartya Sen on Google Scholar
  on Berggruen Institute's YouTube channel
 Profile and Papers at Research Papers in Economics/RePEc
 Fearing Food edited by Julian Morris. Chapter on Sen
 
 

 
1933 births
University of Calcutta alumni
Alumni of Trinity College, Cambridge
Bengali Hindus
Fellows of the Econometric Society
Fellows of Darwin College, Cambridge
Fellows of Nuffield College, Oxford
Fellows of All Souls College, Oxford
Fellows of the American Academy of Arts and Sciences
Fellows of the British Academy
Feminist economists
Harvard University faculty
Harvard Law School faculty
Academic staff of Jadavpur University
Academic staff of Delhi University
Indian atheists
20th-century Indian economists
Indian feminists
Indian political philosophers
Indian Nobel laureates
People in international development
Liberalism in India
Living people
Male feminists
Masters of Trinity College, Cambridge
Honorary Members of the Order of the Companions of Honour
Academics of the London School of Economics
National Humanities Medal recipients
Nobel laureates in Economics
People associated with Santiniketan
Presidents of the Econometric Society
Asian social liberals
Drummond Professors of Political Economy
People from Manikganj District
Recipients of the Bharat Ratna
Presidents of the American Economic Association
Honorary Fellows of the London School of Economics
Honorary Fellows of Bangla Academy
21st-century Indian economists
Scholars from West Bengal
Scientists from West Bengal
Distinguished Fellows of the American Economic Association
International Center for Research on Women
Institute for New Economic Thinking
People from New Alipore
Members of the American Philosophical Society
St. Gregory's High School and College alumni